Mannsdorf an der Donau is a town in the district of Gänserndorf in the Austrian state of Lower Austria.

Geography
Mannsdorf an der Donau lies on the southern edge of the Marchfeld in the Weinviertel in Lower Austria. About 12 percent of the municipality is forested.

References

Cities and towns in Gänserndorf District